Prunella is an Italian fairy tale, originally known as Prezzemolina. Andrew Lang included it in The Grey Fairy Book. It is Aarne-Thompson type 310, the Maiden in the Tower.

Italo Calvino noted that variants were found over all of Italy. The captor who demands his captive perform impossible tasks, and the person, usually the captor's child, who helps with them, is a very common fairy tale theme—Nix Nought Nothing, The Battle of the Birds, The Grateful Prince, or The Master Maid—but this tale unusually makes the captive a girl and the person the captor's son.

Synopsis

Prunella
A girl went to school, and every day, she picked a plum from a tree along the way.  She was called "Prunella" because of this. But the tree belonged to a wicked witch and one day she caught the girl. Prunella grew up as her captive.

One day, the witch sent her with a basket to the well, with orders to bring it back filled with water. The water seeped out every time, and Prunella cried. A handsome young man asked her what her trouble was, and told her that he was Bensiabel, the witch's son; if she kissed him, he would fill the basket. She refused, because he was a witch's son, but he filled the basket with water anyway.  The witch then set her to make bread from un-milled-wheat while she was gone, and Prunella, knowing it was impossible, set to it for a time, and then cried. Bensiabel appeared.  She again refused to kiss a witch's son, but he made the bread for her.

Finally, the witch sent her over the mountains, to get a casket from her sister, knowing her sister was an even more cruel witch, who would starve her to death. Bensiabel told her and offered to save her if she kissed him; she refused. He gave her oil, bread, rope, and a broom, and told her, at his aunt's house, to oil the gate's hinges, give a fierce dog the bread, give the rope to a woman trying to lower the bucket into the well by her hair, and give the broom to a woman trying to clean the hearth with her tongue. Then she should take the casket from the cupboard and leave at once. She did this. As she left, the witch called to all of them to kill her, but they refused because of what Prunella had given them.

The witch was enraged when Prunella returned. She ordered Prunella to tell her in the night which cock had crowed, whenever one did. Prunella still refused to kiss Bensiabel, but he told her each time the yellow, and the black. When the third one crowed, Bensiabel hesitated, because he still hoped to force Prunella to kiss him, and Prunella begged him to save her. He sprang on the witch, and she fell down the stairs and died. Prunella was touched by his goodness and agreed to marry and they lived happily ever after.

Translations
The tale originally appeared as Prezzemolina in 1879, collected from Mantua by Isaia Visentini. The stolen plant was originally parsley (prezzemolo in Italian), as in Rapunzel, but Andrew Lang changed it to a plum and the heroine's name to Prunella. Lang did not name a source for the story.

Author Ruth Manning-Sanders adapted the tale in her workA Book of Witches, wherein the witch's son's name was given as "Benvenuto".

Imbriani's La Prezzemolina
A version from Florence, Tuscany, was published in 1871 by Italian writer . Italo Calvino adapted it in his Italian Folktales.

Summary
Prezzemolina was captured not because of her own eating, but because of her mother's craving for, and theft of, fairies' parsley. The girl was seized when going to school, but after the fairies had sent her to tell her mother to pay what she owed, and the mother sent back that the fairies should take it.

The hero Memé, cousin of the fairies, helped Prezzemolina as Bensiabel did, despite her refusal of kisses. The fairies first order Prezzemolina to bleach the black walls of a room, then paint them with all birds of the air. Memé waves his magic wand and completes this task. Next, the fairies send Prezzemolina to collect a casket ("scatola del Bel-Giullare", in Imbriani's text; "Handsome Clown's box" in Calvino's; "Handsome Minstrel's box", in Zipes's) from the evil Morgan le Fay (Fata Morgana). Prezzemolina goes to Fata Morgana and meets four old women on the way: the first gives her a pot of grease to use on two creeking doors; the second gives her loaves of bread to use on her guard dogs; the third a sewing thread to be given to a cobbler; and the fourth a rag to be given to a baker that is cleaning an oven with their hands. The last woman also advises her to enter Fata Morgana's castle and, while she is away, she is to get the casket and run away as fast as possible. Fata Morgana commands the baker, the cobbler, the dogs and the doors to stop her, but, due to her kind actions, Prezzemolina escapes unscathed. Now at a distance, she opens the casket and a group of musicians escape from it. Memé appears and offers to close the box in exchange for a kiss. Prezzemolina declines, but Memé uses the magic wand to draw everyone back into the box. Prezzemolina then delivers the casket to the fairies. However, there was no test of identifying a rooster's crow.

In the end, Memé and Prezzemolina together destroyed the evil fairies. First they tricked and boiled three fairy ladies in the garden house, and then went to a room where they blew out the magic candles that held the souls of all the others, including Morgan's. They then took over all that had belonged to the fairies, married, and lived happily in Morgan's palace, where they were generous with the servants who had not attacked her despite Morgan's orders.

Analysis
Imbriani, commenting on the tale, noted its initial resemblance to the tale L'Orca, from the Pentamerone, but remarked that the second part of the story was close to The Golden Root. French comparativist Emmanuel Cosquin noted that Imbriani's Tuscan tale (Prezzemolina) contained the motif of a fairy antagonist imposing tasks on the heroine - akin to Psyche of her namesake myth -, also comparing it to Italian The Golden Root.

Calvino's tale (numbered 86 in his collection) was listed by Italian scholars  and Liliana Serafini under type AaTh 428, Il Lupo ("The Wolf") (see below).

Laboulaye's Fragolette
French author Édouard René de Laboulaye published a retelling in which the plant was a strawberry, the heroine was renamed "Fragolette" (from the Italian fragola), and the hero was renamed Belèbon.

In Laboulaye's tale, the action is set in Mantua. A little girl likes to pick up strawberries, and thus is nicknamed "Fragolette" ('little strawberry'). One day, she is picking up berries in the usual spot, when something strikes the back of her head. It is a witch, who takes the girl on her broom to her lair. Once there, the witch forces Fragolette to be her servant. One day, she asks the girl to take a basket to the well and fill it with water. Fragolette goes to the well to fulfill the task, but the basket cannot hold any drop of water. She begins to cry, until a soft voice inquires what is her problem; it belongs to the son of the witch, Belèbon. He asks for a kiss, but Fragolette refuses. At any rate, Belèbon breathes into the basket, fills it with water and gives it to Fragolette.

The next time, the witch tells Fragolette she will travel to Africa and gives the girl a sack of wheat; Fragolette is to use the wheat and bake some loaves of bread for her when she returns later that night. Belèbon helps her by summoning with a whistle an army of rats that grind the wheat into flour and bake enough bread to fill the room.

Later, the witch orders Fragolette to go to Viperine, the witch's sister, and get from her a strong-box. Belèbon appears to her and instructs her on how to proceed: he gives her an oil can, a bread, a cord, and a little broom. She will first cross a dirty stream, she is to compliment it for it to allow her passage. She then is to use the oil on the hinges of a door, throw the bread to a dog, give the cord to a woman next to a well in the courtyard to draw water, the little broom to a cook in the kitchen to clean the oven, enter Viperine's room, get the box and escape. Fragolette follows the instructions to the letter, but Viperine wakes up. The witch's sister commands the cook, the woman at the well, the dog, the door hinges and the stream to stop her, but Fragolette returns safely with the box.

Lastly, Fragolette is to identify between three cocks which is the one who crows. With Belèbon's help, she says it is the white one. The witch springs a trap: she jumps at the girl, but Fragolette escapes through the window, while the witch catches her foot in the window and falls, the fall breaking at once her two tusks, the source of her life and power.

After the witch dies, Fragolette is free, and Belèbon, in love with her, tries to propose to her. Some time later, she concedes, and they are happily married.

Variants
In a North Italian tale also titled Prezzemolina, a human couple live next to some ogresses. One day, the wife sees from her balcony some succulent parsley herbs (prezzemolo) she wants to eat. She creeps into the ogresses' garden, steals some herbs, and goes back home. When the ogresses return home, they notice their garden is ravaged, and set their youngest to watch over the garden. The next day, the young ogress catches the woman in the act, and brings her to her sister to decide his punishment. They strike a deal: the woman is to name her baby Prezzemolina ("Parsley") and give her to the ogresses. Years later, a baby girl is born and given the name Parsley. One day, she is met by the ogresses, who ask her to remind her mother of their deal. The ogresses shove the girl inside a sack and bring her to their lair. Intent on devouring her, the ogresses decide to have her as their servant, and postpone her death until she is old and plump enough. Time passes, and the girl busies herself with many household chores, like cooking and cleaning. When she goes to the well to fetch water, she hears someone wailing at the bottom of the well. She leans a bit to see who it is and finds a cat. She ropes the cat in a bucket, and the animal introduces itself as Gatto-Berlacco, and, whenever she needs any help, she just has to shout for him. Later, the ogresses decide to eat the girl, but first impose tasks on her, for, in case she fails, she will be devoured. The first task is for her go to the coal cellar and wash every black piece inside white. The girl cries over the impossibility of the task, and summons the cat. With a magic word, the cat fulfills the task for her. Next, the ogresses order her to go to the house of Maga Soffia-e-Risoffia, steal a cage with a bird named Biscotto-Binello, and get back before nine in the evening. The girl summons the cat again, who gives her some objects and advice on how to use them: she is to give a marble mortar and wooden pestle to a little witch making pesto, a Pasqualina pie to some guards, and use a pot of lard to oil the hinges of a door behind the guards. It happens as the cat describes. Prezzemolina opens the door, climbs up a staircase and fetches the bird. She passes by the guards and the witch, and goes back to the ogresses' lair. She stops before the cat, who becomes a human prince. He explains he was cursed by the ogresses into cat form, and shows Prezzemolina their captors, now marble statues. Italian writer  sourced the tale from Genova.

Italian writer  published a tale from Padova, Veneto, with the title La bella Prezzemolina ("Beautiful Prezzemolina"). In this tale, an old witch lives with her son Beniamino next to a human widow and her daughter. The girl, who is pregnant, wants to eat the prezzemolo from the witch's garden and steals some, until the witch discovers her and makes a pact for the girl to deliver her child after they are born. Time passes, and a baby girl is born, and given the name Prezzemolina. Despite her mother's best efforts, the witch captures her and takes her to her palace. The witch imposes hard tasks on her: first, to wash and iron a large quntity of clothes. She cries over its difficulty, then the witch's son, Beniamino, offers to help her in exchange for a kiss. Prezzemolina refuses it, but the youth helps her anyway. Next, she is to make the bed in a way that it is possible to jump and dance on the bed without crumpling the sheets. Thirdly, the witch and her cohorts fill a casket with magic and order Prezzemolina to take it. Being curious, she opens it, and Massariol, Salbanei, Pesarol and Komparet jump out of the box and dance around it. Beniamino, who has followed Prezzemolina, locks the things back into the casket. Finally, the old witch decides to get rid of the girl by lighting a fire under a nut tree. Beniamino realizes his mother's trick and vows to free himself from her magic, so he plots with Prezzemolina: they approach the cauldron of boiling water and shove the witch inside. Free at last, Beniamino marries Prezzemolina. In his notes, Coltro remarked that the central action (heroine helped by the sorceress's son) also occurred in Basile's The Golden Root (Pentamerone, Day Five, Fourth Story).

In a Veronese tale first collected in 1891 from informant Caterina Marsilli with the title La storia della Bella Parsemolina or La storia della bella Prezzemolina ("The tale of Beautiful Prezzemolina"), a pregnant woman lives next to an old ortolana woman, and steals parsley from the latter's garden to eat, until one day the ortolana discovers her. The woman promises to give the ortolana her first child, when she is born. Time passes, and a girl is born, given the name Bella Prezzemolina. Whenever she goes to school, she passes by the ortolana's house, who tells her to remind her mother of what was promised. The ortolana then kidnapps Prezzemolina and takes the girl to her castle as servant, imposing difficult tasks on her. First, the girl is to wash and iron all of her clothes while the ortolana is away. Prezzemolina cries a bit, until the ortolana's son, Bel Giulio, offers his help: he takes out a wand and with a magic command fulfills the task for her. Next, the ortolana orders the girl to clean the entire house, since her son is getting married. Bel Giulio uses the wand again to help her. Thirdly, the ortolana says she will place three roosters in the stables (a red, a black and a white one), and Prezzemolina has to guess which one will crow. Bel Giulio advises her to stay by the door to his room, where he will be with his wife, and he will whisper her the correct answer. The ortolana asks outside the room which cock crowed, but Prezzemolina keeps quiet. She enters the room and kills someone in their bed, then goes to sleep. The next day, she wakes up to make breakfast for her son and his wife, and sees Bel Giulio with Prezzemolina. Realizing she killed the wrong person, the ortolana kills herself. Bel Giulio lives happily ever after with Prezzemolina.

Professor Licia Masoni, from University of Bologna, collected two variants of Prezzemolina from two informants in Frassinoro. In both tales, the Prezzemolina-like protagonist is taken by a sorceress to her place and forced to perform tasks for her, one of which is to get a box from another sorceress.

Analysis

Tale type
Folklorist D. L. Ashliman, scholar Jack Zipes and Italian scholars  and Liliana Serafini list Prezzemolina as a variant of tale type ATU 310, "The Maiden in the Tower" (akin to German Rapunzel), of the international Aarne-Thompson-Uther Index. Ashliman and Zipes also grouped Prunella under type 310.

The motif of the box from the witch appears in another tale type: ATU 425B, "Son of the Witch", which includes the ancient myth of Cupid and Psyche. In that regard, other scholars (like , Geneviève Massignon and Walter Anderson) classified Prezzemolina as type AaTh 428, "The Wolf", a tale type considered by some scholars to be a fragmentary version of type 425B (Cupid and Psyche).

According to Danish scholar Inger Margrethe Boberg, the heroine's helper in type 428 may be a young man cursed to be an animal in Northern Europe, while in variants from Southern Europe her helper is the witch's own son, who falls in love with the heroine.

See also

 The Tale about Baba-Yaga (Russian fairy tale)
 The Little Girl Sold with the Pears
 La Fada Morgana (Catalan folk tale)
 The Man and the Girl at the Underground Mansion
 Pájaro Verde (Mexican folktale)
 Fairer-than-a-Fairy (Caumont de La Force)
 Rapunzel
 Graciosa and Percinet
 Maroula
 Puddocky
 The Enchanted Canary
 The King of Love
 The Magic Swan Geese
 The Two Caskets
 The Water of Life
 The Witch

References

External links
 Prunella at SurLaLune Fairy Tales
 Alternate link

Female characters in fairy tales
Italian fairy tales
Witchcraft in fairy tales
Stories within Italian Folktales
ATU 300-399
ATU 400-459